The 1943–44 Gauliga was the eleventh season of the Gauliga, the first tier of the football league system in Germany from 1933 to 1945. It was the fifth season of the league held during the Second World War and the last completed one.

The league operated in thirty-one regional divisions, two more than in the previous season, with the league containing 358 clubs all up, 60 more than the previous season. The  league champions entered the 1944 German football championship, won by Dresdner SC who defeated Luftwaffe team  LSV Hamburg 4–0 in the final. It was Dresden's second national championship, having won the competition in the previous season as well.

The number of Gauligas, thirty-one, increased by two compare to the previous season because of the splitting off of the Gauliga Osthannover from the Gauliga Südhannover-Braunschweig and the creation of the Gauliga Böhmen und Mähren.

The 1943–44 season saw the continued participation of military and police teams, especially in the eastern regions. Gauliga champions like LSV Hamburg, LSV Danzig, LSV Mölders Krakau and LSV Rerick were associated with the German air force, the Luftwaffe, LSV standing for Luftwaffen Sportverein while MSV Brünn, WSV Celle and HSV Groß-Born were clubs of the Wehrmacht.

In the part of Czechoslovakia annexed into Germany in March 1939, the Protectorate of Bohemia and Moravia, a separate Czech league continued to exist which was not part of the Gauliga system or the German championship.

Champions

The 1943–44 Gauliga champions qualified for the knock-out stages of the German championship. HSV Groß-Born and 1. FC Nürnberg were knocked-out in the semi-finals while LSV Hamburg and Dresdner SC contested the final which the latter won.

FC Schalke 04 won their eleventh consecutive Gauliga title, VfB Königsberg and Kickers Offenbach their fifth, Germania Königshütte and First Vienna FC their third while SDW Posen, SpVgg Wilhelmshaven, Eintracht Braunschweig, Holstein Kiel, Dresdner SC, 1. FC Nürnberg, VfR Mannheim, SV Dessau 05, TuS Neuendorf and FC Mühlhausen 93 defended their 1942–43 Gauliga title.

# Denotes Gauliga created through sub-division of existing Gauliga for the 1943–44 season.
† Denotes newly created Gauliga for the 1943–44 season.

German championship

References

Sources
 kicker-Almanach 1990  Yearbook of German football, publisher: kicker Sportmagazin, published: 1989, 
 100 Jahre Süddeutscher Fußball-Verband  100 Years of the Southern German Football Federation, publisher: SFV, published: 1997
 Die deutschen Gauligen 1933–45 – Heft 1–3  Tables of the Gauligas 1933–45, publisher: DSFS

External links
 Das Deutsche Fussball Archiv  Historic German league tables

1943-44
1
Ger